Langworthy may refer to:

People
 Edward Langworthy (Founding Father) (1738–1802), delegate in the Continental Congress from the state of Georgia
 Edward Ryley Langworthy (1797–1874), British businessman and Liberal politician
 Mary Lewis Langworthy (1872-1949), American teacher, writer, lecturer, and executive
 William Fitzgerald Langworthy (1867–1951), Conservative member of the Canadian House of Commons
 B. F. Langworthy (1822–1907), politician in the state of Minnesota

Places
 Langworthy, Iowa, an unincorporated community in north-central Jones County, Iowa, United States
 Langworthy, Salford, a small area of Pendleton, Greater Manchester, England
 Langworthy (ward), an electoral ward of the Salford City Council

Other
 Langworthy House, an historic octagon house in Dubuque, Iowa
 Langworthy Metrolink station, a light rail station serving Langworthy, Salford
 Langworthy Professor, an endowed chair in the School of Physics and Astronomy, University of Manchester
 Langworthy Brook, a tributary of the River Lemon in Devon, England.